Melodee M. Spevack is an American voice actress who has worked on-camera and as voiceover artist for video games, looping for TV and film, original animation and English-language adaptations of Japanese anime shows.

Filmography

Anime

Western Animation

Film

Video games

Live action

References

 Interview with Melodee Spevack at Digipedia
 Interview with Michael McConnohie and Melodee Spevack

External links

 
 
 

1953 births
American voice actresses
Living people
Actresses from Chicago
American video game actresses
American casting directors
Women casting directors
American voice directors
Film producers from Illinois
American women film producers
20th-century American actresses
21st-century American actresses